Nagaroor  is a village in Thiruvananthapuram district in the state of Kerala, India.

Demographics
 India census, Nagaroor had a population of 14854 with 6942 males and 7912 females.

Nagaroor Grama Panchayath is located in Trivandrum District, Chirayinkil Taluk.  The people of the village represent several different religions and different political parties; but are friendly and co operative.

Amenities include Nagaroor village office, sub registrar office, and post office. It also has a milk society, a fish market, telephone exchange, a centralised bank as well an engineering college RAJADHANI, a petrol pump and government health center.

References 

Villages in Thiruvananthapuram district